The Communauté de communes Creuse Sud Ouest is a communauté de communes, an intercommunal structure, in the Creuse department, in the Nouvelle-Aquitaine region, central France. It was created in January 2017 by the merger of the former communautés de communes CIATE du Pays Creuse-Thaurion-Gartempe and Bourganeuf et Royère-de-Vassivière. Its area is 908.6 km2, and its population was 13,563 in 2018. Its seat is in Saint-Dizier-Masbaraud.

Communes
The communauté de communes consists of the following 43 communes:

Ahun
Ars
Auriat
Banize
Bosmoreau-les-Mines
Bourganeuf
Chamberaud
La Chapelle-Saint-Martial
Chavanat
Le Donzeil
Faux-Mazuras
Fransèches
Janaillat
Lépinas
Maisonnisses
Mansat-la-Courrière
Montboucher
Le Monteil-au-Vicomte
Moutier-d'Ahun
Pontarion
La Pouge
Royère-de-Vassivière
Saint-Amand-Jartoudeix
Saint-Avit-le-Pauvre
Saint-Dizier-Masbaraud
Saint-Georges-la-Pouge
Saint-Hilaire-la-Plaine
Saint-Hilaire-le-Château
Saint-Junien-la-Bregère
Saint-Martial-le-Mont
Saint-Martin-Château
Saint-Martin-Sainte-Catherine
Saint-Michel-de-Veisse
Saint-Moreil
Saint-Pardoux-Morterolles
Saint-Pierre-Bellevue
Saint-Pierre-Chérignat
Saint-Priest-Palus
Sardent
Soubrebost
Sous-Parsat
Thauron
Vidaillat

References

Creuse Sud Ouest
Creuse Sud Ouest